Campbell Magnay (born 10 November 1996) is an Australian rugby union player who currently plays as a centre for the Suntory Sungoliath in the Japan Top Rugby competition. He also represented Queensland Country in the inaugural National Rugby Championship.

Career

After representing Queensland and Australia at schoolboy level, Magnay was picked up by Queensland club side GPS upon completing his studies at St Joseph's College, Nudgee.   His performances in the Queensland Premier Rugby competition brought him to the attention of the newly formed Queensland Country NRC side and he became the youngest player contracted to either of the two Queensland NRC squads.   Such was his impact in the 6 games he played for Country in 2014, he was handed a Super Rugby contract while aged only 17 by the Brisbane-based Reds ahead of the 2015 Super Rugby season.

Personal life
Magnay currently studies a Bachelor of Commerce	at Deakin University.

Super Rugby statistics

References

1996 births
Living people
Australian rugby union players
Rugby union centres
Rugby union players from Brisbane
Queensland Country (NRC team) players
Queensland Reds players
Tokyo Sungoliath players
Australian expatriate rugby union players
Expatriate rugby union players in Japan
Melbourne Rebels players